Ashikaga (足利) may refer to:

 Ashikaga clan (足利氏 Ashikaga-shi), a Japanese samurai clan descended from the Minamoto clan; and that formed the basis of the eponymous shogunate
 Ashikaga shogunate (足利幕府 Ashikaga bakufu), a Japanese shōgun dynasty
 Ashikaga era (足利時代 Ashikaga jidai), a period of Japanese history related to the eponymous dynasty
 Ashikaga clan (Fujiwara) (足利氏 Ashikaga-shi), a Japanese samurai clan descended from the Fujiwara clan
 Ashikaga, Tochigi (足利市 Ashikaga-shi), a city in Japan
 Ashikaga Station (足利駅 Ashikaga eki), a train station in the city of Ashikaga
 Ashikaga District, Tochigi (足利郡), a former district located in Tochigi
 Ashikaga Junior College (足利短期大学 Ashikaga tanki daigaku), a school in the city of Ashikaga
 Ashikaga Institute of Technology (足利工業大学 Ashikaga kogyō daigaku), a school in the city of Ashikaga
 Ashikaga murder case, a murder case that occurred in the city of Ashikaga

See also 

 Northern Court or Ashikaga Pretenders, pretenders to the Japanese imperial throne during the Ashikaga shogunate